A specialist registrar (SpR) is a doctor in the United Kingdom or the Republic of Ireland who is receiving advanced training in a specialist field of medicine in order to become a consultant in that specialty.

After graduation from medical school, a specialist registrar will undertake several years of work and training as an intern or pre-registration house officer, and as a senior house officer. It may be required to take diploma examinations in order to enter registrar training. These are administered by the medical royal college or in some cases a separate postgraduate training body responsible for that specialty and are usually termed "memberships". This means membership to the Royal College of their specialty.  For example, those wishing to specialise in general medicine must take the examination for Membership of the Royal College of Physicians.

Doctors will work in specialist registrar posts for around four to six years, depending on their speciality. They gain experience in a broad speciality (for example, general medicine), and often also a subspecialty (such as cardiology). After this they receive a certificate termed a Certificate of Completion of Training (CCT) in the UK, or Certificate of Completion of Specialist Training in Ireland. The certificate is awarded based on satisfactory regular completion of assessments and milestones (known in the UK as the Record of In-Training Assessments, or RITA). In many specialties, doctors must also complete an 'exit' exam or diploma in their specialty, often termed a "fellowship" exam. Doctors with a CCT or CCST are transferred to the specialist register administered by the Medical Council, permitting application to consultant jobs. Specialist registrars are encouraged to undertake research in their field, and many choose to do this by means of a Ph.D. or MD.

UK usage

The entry into Specialty Registrar posts is competitive. Published competition ratios by the NHS report that most specialties receive many multiples more applicants than available posts. Regional advertisements were placed by local deaneries, which controlled the number of places and the funding for posts. The open competition is afforded and, via shortlisting and interviews, successful applicants were given posts for 4–6 years depending on the specialty. A National Training Number is awarded concurrently and is attached to the post rather than the doctor, again historically. The number of posts available is strictly linked to the number of consultants required in a particular speciality, and therefore in the more popular specialities such as Cardiology, General Surgery and Sub-Specialties, Orthopaedics and Plastic Surgery it often took many attempts to get a post - leading to what was known as the "SHO bottleneck", whereby doctors were stuck at the grade of senior house officer for a number of years. Changes in postgraduate medical training (Modernising Medical Careers) are underway to alleviate this problem. Choice of final specialty is now limited by success in application, rather than time spent waiting for a post to be available and offered.

General Practice

General Practice (GP) Training most commonly entails at least 3 years to achieve a CCT Certificate of Completion of Training (CCT) on a General Medical Council (GMC) approved program
. This training and competency achievement may be achieved by other means. The CCT involves at least 18 months in hospital posts and at least 12 months in GP clinics or primary care. Doctors registered in a GP training program are known as GP Specialty Registrars (GP-ST). GP-STs are known to the Royal College of General Practitioners (RCGP) as Associates in Training (AiT). This training accompanies MRCGP examinations, which leads to MRCGP membership and a place on the GP Register. MRCGP accreditation is now required to qualify as a General Practitioner.

References

Medical education in the United Kingdom
Healthcare occupations in the United Kingdom